National route 10 is fully paved from Oujda to Agadir. Especially from Oujda to Errachidia there is very little traffic.

Roads in Morocco